Sérvulo is a given name. Notable people with the name include:

 Sérvulo Gutiérrez (1914–1961), Peruvian artist
 Sérvulo (footballer) (born 1985), Brazilian footballer